Agim Ibraimi (born 29 August 1988) is a Macedonian professional footballer who plays as a midfielder.

Club career

Childhood and early career
Ibraimi was born in Tetovo, SR Macedonia, to Albanian parents. While growing up in Tetovo, Agim joined the Shkendija youth team and eventually broke through into the senior squad at the age of 17.

Shkendija and Red Bull Salzburg
Ibraimi debuted for Shkendija in 2005 and was a crucial member of the team. He made forty nine appearances and scored three goals, helping Shkendija reach fifth place in the Prva Liga. Making a significant impact on the club at such a young age, Agim was picked up by Red Bull Salzburg and moved abroad.

At Red Bull Salzburg, Ibraimi developed further under their tutelage. In two years at Salzburg, Ibraimi made three appearances for the senior team.

Olimpija
Ibraimi joined Olimpija who were at that time playing in the Slovenian Second League. His first season in the Slovenian capital was very successful, as Olimpija finished as league winners with Ibraimi scoring eleven goals.

The start of his second season in Ljubljana was not as smooth. After Miran Pavlin, the director of football who brought him to the club, departed for Koper, Ibraimi wanted to join him. But Olimpija's board had none of it, as the player still had a valid contract with the club. The start of his first season in Slovenian PrvaLiga was difficult, his form was not up to standard, but it did pick up eventually and Ibraimi regained his place in Olimpija's first eleven. He scored his first goal in the Slovenian PrvaLiga on 28 August against Koper.

Eskisehirspor
Ibraimi terminated his contract with Olimpija in the summer of 2010 and signed a three-year deal with Turkish team Eskişehirspor on 3 September 2010.  He made his debut for Eskisehirspor on 25 September 2010 when he came off the bench in the 77th minute, but his team lost 1–0. Ibraimi failed to adjust to the Turkish league so he and the club agreed to mutually terminate the contract and Ibraimi joined Nafta Lendava during the 2011 January transfer window.

Maribor
On 10 June 2011, it was announced that Ibraimi has signed a three-year contract with the Slovenian club Maribor. He made his debut for Maribor against Dudelange in the qualifying rounds of the UEFA Champions League where he also scored his first goal for the club. Despite not qualifying past the third round of qualifications, Maribor had a chance in the play-offs for the UEFA Europa League against Rangers. Ibraimi helped Maribor reach the group stages of the Europa League after scoring a goal from just inside the box in the first leg. Despite Maribor finished in last place in their group, Ibraimi scored against Braga in the only match of the group stage where Maribor secured a point. In May 2012, Ibraimi signed a new contract with the club until May 2015. In the same month, he scored directly from a corner kick in an 8–0 win against Triglav Kranj and won the league title with Maribor. In December 2012, he won the Macedonian Footballer of the Year award. He was voted as one of the best midfield players in the 2012–13 Slovenian PrvaLiga alongside his teammate Goran Cvijanović and Nik Omladič. He was also selected as the overall best player in the 2012–13 PrvaLiga season.

Cagliari
On 31 August 2013, Agim Ibraimi moved to Cagliari on loan in exchange for Pablo Ceppelini and money. In his second game for Cagliari, he provided an assist against Inter Milan. On 2 March 2014, Ibraimi scored his first goal for Cagliari against Udinese and providing an assist eight minutes earlier. Only maintaining five starting appearances for Cagliari, he did not receive much playing time in Italy.

Agim Ibraimi has reached an agreement with Maribor to extend his contract until May 2017.

Maribor
Returning to Maribor, Ibraimi helped the club reach the UEFA Champions League group stage by scoring three goals in the qualifying rounds against Zrinjski Mostar and Maccabi Tel Aviv. On 5 November 2014, Maribor drew against Chelsea in the Champions League. Ibraimi scored in the 50th minute with a left-footed curling shot from the edge of the box.

Astana
On 15 June 2016, Ibraimi signed a two-and-a-half-year contract with Kazakhstan Premier League side FC Astana. After an injury he ended his contract in the end of April 2017 and became a free agent.

Dinamo Tirana
In July 2021, Ibraimi joined the newly promoted side Dinamo Tirana, signing a contract for the 2021–22 Kategoria Superiore season. After a difficult season, in which he scored 8 goals in 36 league appearances, which weren't enough to keep the team in the top flight, Ibrahimi announced his departure and became a free agent.

International career
Ibraimi was capped for the Macedonian under-21 team during the qualifying campaign for the 2011 UEFA European Under-21 Championship.

He received his first call-up to the Macedonian senior team for a friendly match against Spain, which took place on 12 August 2009. In the match, he came on as a substitute for Goran Pandev in the 81st minute of the game. On 12 October 2012, Ibraimi scored his first goal for Macedonia in a 2–1 home defeat against Croatia in the 2014 FIFA World Cup qualifications. He scored another goal just three days later against Serbia in a 1–0 win. In total, he made 40 appearances for the team, and also scored 7 goals.

Personal life
Ibraimi is multilingual, speaking six languages fluently: Albanian, English, German, Macedonian, Serbo-Croatian and Slovenian. He is a cousin of professional football player Arijan Ademi. In February 2016, after having spent years of playing in the country, Ibraimi acquired Slovenian citizenship.

Career statistics

Club

International

Scores and results list North Macedonia's goal tally first, score column indicates score after each Ibraimi goal.

Honours

Club
Olimpija
Slovenian Second League: 2008–09

Maribor
Slovenian PrvaLiga: 2011–12, 2012–13, 2014–15
Slovenian Cup: 2011–12, 2012–13, 2015–16
Slovenian Supercup: 2012, 2013, 2014

Astana
Kazakhstan Premier League: 2016

Shkëndija
Macedonian First Football League: 2018–19

Individual
PrvaLiga Player of the season: 2012–13
PrvaLiga Team of the Year: 2013
Macedonian Footballer of the Year: 2012, 2014

References

External links

Profile at NZS 
Profile at Macedonian Football

1988 births
Living people
Sportspeople from Tetovo
Macedonian Muslims
Albanian footballers from North Macedonia
Association football wingers
Macedonian footballers
North Macedonia youth international footballers
North Macedonia under-21 international footballers
North Macedonia international footballers
KF Shkëndija players
FC Red Bull Salzburg players
NK Olimpija Ljubljana (2005) players
Eskişehirspor footballers
NK Nafta Lendava players
NK Maribor players
Cagliari Calcio players
FC Astana players
NK Domžale players
FK Kukësi players
FK Dinamo Tirana players
Macedonian First Football League players
Austrian Football Bundesliga players
Slovenian Second League players
Slovenian PrvaLiga players
Süper Lig players
Serie A players
Kazakhstan Premier League players
Kategoria Superiore players
Macedonian expatriate footballers
Macedonian expatriate sportspeople in Austria
Expatriate footballers in Austria
Macedonian expatriate sportspeople in Slovenia
Expatriate footballers in Slovenia
Macedonian expatriate sportspeople in Turkey
Expatriate footballers in Turkey
Macedonian expatriate sportspeople in Italy
Expatriate footballers in Italy
Macedonian expatriate sportspeople in Kazakhstan
Expatriate footballers in Kazakhstan
Macedonian expatriate sportspeople in Albania
Expatriate footballers in Albania